190 New King's Road, also known as Jasmine House, is a Grade II listed house on New King's Road, Fulham, London, built in the late 18th century.

It is mentioned by Pevsner as a "late Georgian detached villa, with pretty enriched cornice and doorcase."

References

External links

Grade II listed houses in London
Houses in the London Borough of Hammersmith and Fulham
New King's Road
Grade II listed buildings in the London Borough of Hammersmith and Fulham
Residential buildings completed in the 18th century